Outrageous Fourtunes is a limited edition acoustic EP by British folk metal band Skyclad. It was first released as a bonus CD for special edition copies of the band's album The Answer Machine?. Remaining copies were then sold at concerts and at select online retailers. A complete, low quality version of the EP was made available free on the Internet, with the band's blessing.

Track listing
"Land of the Rising Slum" (Acoustic)
"Sins of Emission" (Acoustic)
"Alone in Death's Shadow" (Acoustic)
"Spinning Jenny" (Acoustic)

External links
Arnaut's Skyclad Homepage – EP available for download in MP3 format

1998 EPs
Skyclad (band) albums